St Bernard Pass may refer to:

Great St Bernard Pass crosses the Valais Alps between Martigny, Switzerland and Aosta, Italy
Little St Bernard Pass lies between Mont Blanc and the Graian Alps, connecting Bourg St Maurice, France to Courmayeur, Italy

See also
 San Bernardino Pass in the Swiss Alps connecting Thusis and Bellinzona